was a Japanese manga artist and illustrator from Fukuoka Prefecture. Her debut was with a work called Calling, which she made when she was only fifteen. She chose not to go to high school so that she could draw manga. Fujiwara was a fan of RPGs such as Final Fantasy, which shows in her works. She was also good friends of Jun Mochizuki and Yana Toboso.

Fujiwara's works Watashi no Ookami-san and Dear have both been published in Square Enix's Monthly Gangan Wing. Two drama CDs have been made of her work Dear. Fujiwara's manga Inu x Boku SS was adapted into an anime series by David Production which aired in Japan between January and March 2012. At the time of her death, she was serializing her manga Katsute Mahō Shōjo to Aku wa Tekitai Shiteita. in Square Enix's Gangan Joker online magazine, leaving the series unfinished.

Works

Manga 
 Calling
 Stray Doll
 Watashi no Ookami-san
 Dear
 
 Inu x Boku SS

Drama CDs 
 Dear
 Dear: A story of the next day

References

External links 
 Official blog 
 

 https://sojapan.jp/2015/04/news-memoriam-cocoa-fujiwara/

1983 births
2015 deaths
Japanese female comics artists
Female comics writers
Women manga artists
Manga artists from Fukuoka Prefecture
21st-century Japanese women writers